Samuel Troilius (22 May 1706 – 18 January 1764) was Archbishop of Uppsala from 1758 to his death.

Biography
He was born in Stora Skedvi parish in the province of Dalarna. His parents were Olof Troilius and Helena Gangia. His father was a vicar in the Church of Sweden.

In 1724, he had become student in Uppsala University, and was by 1734 appointed assistant professor of Greek and Roman literature, after having disputed in 1732 with the thesis De magnetismo morum naturali.  He was ordained in 1736 and an 1740 he became a priest.

Troilius  moved to Stockholm in 1740 as court chaplain, and the following year became the confessor of the Swedish Royal Family.  In 1751, he was unanimously elected new  Bishop of Västerås following the death of Andreas Kallsenius. In 1760, after the death of Henric Benzelius, he was elected Archbishop of Uppsala. In 1760, Troilius also was elected a member of the Royal Swedish Academy of Sciences.

His marriages were with Anna Elisabeth Angerstein in 1740 and with Brita Elisabet Silfverstolpe in 1751.
In 1756, he and his descendants were ennobled under the surname von Troil.  His son Uno von Troil (1746–1803)  also served as Archbishop of Uppsala.

See also 
 List of Archbishops of Uppsala

References

Other sources
 Svenskt biografiskt handlexikon, article Samuel Troilius In Swedish

1706 births
1764 deaths
People from Säter Municipality
Uppsala University alumni
Lutheran archbishops of Uppsala
Bishops of Västerås
18th-century Lutheran archbishops
Members of the Royal Swedish Academy of Sciences
Age of Liberty people